Acisoma variegatum, the slender pintail is a species of dragonfly in the family Libellulidae.

Distribution
Eastern and south-eastern Africa; Ethiopia to Katanga and north-eastern South Africa

Habitat
This species is found in open marsh, often in low-lying and expansive areas such as flood plains. Also found near ponds and reservoirs.

Gallery

References

Libellulidae
Insects described in 1898